Robindra Ramnarine "Robin" Singh (born 14 September 1963) is an Indian former cricketer and cricket coach. He represented India in one Test and 136 ODIs between 1989 and 2001 as an all-rounder. He has coached the Indian Premier League's Mumbai Indians since 2010 and the Caribbean Premier League's Barbados Tridents since 2013. He has also coached the Deccan Chargers in the IPL's inaugural year. As a player, he was known for his calmness and ability to perform under pressure. He brought to Indian cricket world class fielding.

Born in Trinidad to Indo-Trinidadian parents, Singh moved to India in 1984 and studied at Madras University during which he played club and college-level cricket. He helped Tamil Nadu win the Ranji Trophy in 1988, and was one of the season's most consistent players. Tamil Nadu won the trophy then after 33 long years and have not won it again since. He captained both Tamil Nadu and South Zone. He gave up his Trinidad and Tobago passport so he could become an Indian citizen and play for India's national cricket team.

Early life 
Robindra Ramnarine Singh was born in Princes Town, Trinidad and Tobago, to Ramnarine and Savitri Singh on 14 September 1963, and is of Indian descent.
 His forefathers were originally from Ajmer in Rajasthan. At the age of 19, Singh moved to Madras, India, where he earned a master's degree in economics at the University of Madras while beginning his cricket career. He currently resides in Chennai, India, with his wife Sujata and son Dhananjay, although his parents and siblings still live in Trinidad and Tobago.

Domestic career 
While in Trinidad, Singh captained the Trinidad youth cricket team in regional tournaments from 1982 to 1983. He represented the senior Trinidad cricket team in two one-day matches in 1983, during which he played alongside Phil Simmons, David Williams, Larry Gomes, Gus Logie, Rangy Nanan, Sheldon Gomes, and Richard Gabriel.

Singh started his first-class career for Tamil Nadu during the 1985–86 season. Tamil Nadu won the Ranji Trophy for the first time in 33 years with Singh performing outstandingly. During his nearly two decade long career, he was a genuine all-rounder for his club, making more than 6,000 runs and taking 172 wickets with his medium-fast bowling.

International career 
Singh made his debut for the Indian national cricket team in a One Day International against the West Indies cricket team on 11 March 1989. He played two one-day Internationals, coming in to bat at number 7 both times in futile situations. The Indian team dropped Singh after the series, and he played in domestic and overseas leagues for the next seven years, after which he secured a regular place on the Indian cricket team. Singh was recalled for the Titan Cup tournament in 1996. He remained a regular player in the One Day Internationals until 2001. Singh was known for his middle-to-lower order batting, medium-pace bowling, and his ground fielding skills. He was considered as the best Indian fielder in those times. He was also known for his batting in closing overs (usually along with Ajay Jadeja), which made him an integral player during the 1999 Cricket World Cup. Throughout his career, Singh was considered a better fit for One Day matches.

Coaching career 
Singh began coaching soon after his retirement. His first coaching position was with the Indian under-19 cricket team. In 2004, he began coaching the Hong Kong national cricket team, helping it qualify for the 2004 Asia Cup. In 2006, Singh was appointed coach of the India A cricket team, where he coached cricketers such as Gautam Gambhir and Robin Uthappa. Several cricketers whom Singh coached went on to play for the Indian national team. Singh was named the Indian national team fielding coach in 2007 and 2008 and was appointed the first head coach of the Deccan Chargers franchise in the Indian Premier League.

Singh remained the fielding coach for the Indian national cricket team until October 2009 and was the batting coach of the Mumbai Indians, an Indian Premier League team. He joined MI in 2010 as Head coach for 3 years, which was a turning point in the team's fortunes as before that they had failed to qualify in the top four. He helped the Mumbai Indians occupy the runner-up position during the 2010 IPL season and was a part of the coaching structure since then winning the 2013 IPL season, the 2015 IPL season  2017 and 2019 and 2020 Indian Premier League championships. He also helped win the 2013 Champions League Twenty20, and the 2011 Champions League Twenty20.

Singh coached the Khulna Division cricket team in the Bangladesh Premier League, where he helped Dwayne Smith and Andre Russell further their cricket skills. In 2012, the Uva cricket team, under Singh's coaching, won the Sri Lanka Premier League tournament.

He was also the coach of the Barbados Tridents. Since its inception, the Tridents have won once, and have played two finals and a semifinal. Robin Singh was also the Head Coach and Mentor of City Kaitak, which finished as the runners-up of the 2017 edition of Hong Kong T20 Blitz. He was also the Head Coach of Karaikudi Kaalai, in the Tamil Nadu Premier League, between 2016 and 2017. He also coached the Kerala Kings, who were crowned as the Champions of the inaugural edition of the T10 League. He moved teams in 2018 to a new franchise, Northern Warriors for the second edition of the T10 League and took that team to victory in the tournament, making it back to back titles albeit with 2 different teams. In the 2020 edition Northern Warriors won yet again and Singh was replaced due to franchise ownership changing hands .

Singh was also involved in coaching  the senior and junior USA cricket teams. In 2011, Singh coached the United States women's cricket team at the World Cup Qualifier Tournament in Bangladesh.

Robin Singh was appointed Director of Cricket - UAE Cricket and Head Coach of the UAE National Cricket Team in 2020.After 2 years of the pandemic disrupted his tenure at the start with virtually no cricket being played by his wards in a few months of active cricket uae had a series of successes to qualify for the ICC T20 World Cup in Australia. Although they didn't make it to the super 12s they had 3 hard fought games with few players putting up notable performances. He has currently been appointed the GM of MI Emirates for the inaugural edition of the UAE ILT20 league in 2023.

Initiatives 
Robin Singh launched his academy, Robin Singh Sports Academy in Dubai, United Arab Emirates, which aims at providing state of the art facilities for the youngsters. The mission of his academy is to be a one-stop destination for all sports in the UAE expanding to cover the GCC and to help identify and nurture sportsmen and women to become champions and ambassadors for their country, and contribute towards a healthier community.

References

External links

1963 births
Living people
India One Day International cricketers
India Test cricketers
Indian cricketers
Tamil Nadu cricketers
Trinidad and Tobago cricketers
South Zone cricketers
Cricketers at the 1998 Commonwealth Games
Coaches of the Indian national cricket team
Indian Premier League coaches
Indian cricket coaches
Cricketers at the 1999 Cricket World Cup
Trinidad and Tobago emigrants to India
Cricketers from Chennai
Sri Lanka Premier League coaches
People from Princes Town region
Coaches of the Hong Kong national cricket team
Coaches of the United States national cricket team
Caribbean Premier League coaches
People with acquired Indian citizenship
People who lost Trinidad and Tobago citizenship
Commonwealth Games competitors for India